Buckinghamshire Council is a unitary local authority in England, the area of which constitutes most of the ceremonial county of Buckinghamshire. It was created in April 2020 from the areas that were previously administered by Buckinghamshire County Council including the districts of South Bucks, Chiltern, Wycombe and Aylesbury Vale; since 1997 the City of Milton Keynes has been a separate unitary authority.

History

The plan for a single unitary authority was proposed by Martin Tett, leader of the county council, and was backed by Communities Secretary James Brokenshire. District councils had also proposed a different plan in which Aylesbury Vale becomes a unitary authority and the other three districts becomes another unitary authority. The district councils opposed the (single) unitary Buckinghamshire plan.

Statutory instruments for a single unitary authority were made on 22 May 2019 and a shadow authority of 202 members was subsequently formed.

The council is based at The Gateway in Aylesbury, the site of the old district council. The new authority came into being on 1 April 2020.

Composition

At the first meeting of the shadow authority, Richard Scott was elected chair of the authority and Martin Tett as chair of the seventeen member shadow executive committee.

Due to the postponement of the 2020 United Kingdom local elections until 2021, it was announced on 18 March 2020 that all of the current shadow authority members would become councillors and the shadow executive members would form the cabinet. They would stay in post until the inaugural election took place in May 2021.

When founded, the council had 200 councillors, made up of members from the former County Council and District Councils, although only 199 were listed on the council website. Since the result of boundary changes, from the 2021 Buckinghamshire Council election, there are now 147 seats, all of which were contested.

Logo

The logo of Buckinghamshire Council consists of a blue circle with a white swan flying above the hills, with a row of three trees. The words 'Buckinghamshire Council' and 'est.2020' are written above and below respectively.

See also

2019–21 structural changes to local government in England

References

External links

Unitary authority councils of England
Local education authorities in England
Local authorities in Buckinghamshire
Major precepting authorities in England
Leader and cabinet executives